Richard Brittain (born 24 September 1983) is a Scottish former professional footballer. He spent the 2015–16 season as manager of Brora Rangers after a short playing spell at the club. He started his career at Livingston and also played for Raith Rovers, St Mirren and Ross County.

Playing career

Livingston
Brittain started his career with Almondvale side Livingston in 2002, playing 65 league games and scoring four goals. Brittain was a victim of a team-mate dispute after new signing Sergio Berti spat at him during a pre-season friendly. This led to Berti being sacked by the club, although this decision was later overturned by the Scottish Football Association following an appeal by Berti resulting in the club paying £250,000 plus compensation. During his time at Livingston, he was loaned out to Raith Rovers in 2003. Brittain was cup-tied for Livingston's victory in the 2004 Scottish League Cup Final having previously played in the competition during his loan spell at Raith.

St Mirren
In July 2006, despite interest from French clubs Montpellier and Racing Club Strasbourg, Brittain chose to sign for Scottish Premier League side St Mirren on a free transfer. At St Mirren, he was most noted for his goal against Rangers on 30 December 2006, which was his only league goal for the Saints.

Ross County
Brittain was released by St Mirren in May 2008 and signed for Scottish First Division side Ross County in June 2008. Upon his move to Ross County, Brittain was reunited with Derek Adams, the club's manager, the two having played together while at Livingston.

Brittain made his debut in the opening game of the season, as Ross County lost, 2–1, against Dundee before scoring his first goal on 13 September 2008, in a 2–1 loss against St Johnstone. Brittain would finish his first season at the club, making thirty-eight appearances and scoring five in all competitions.

Brittain captained Ross County through victories in The Scottish Cup against SPL sides Hibs and Celtic. The famous 2–0 victory over Celtic at Hampden Park in the semi-final earned Ross County a place in the 2010 Scottish Cup Final, the club's first ever major final, which County eventually lost 3–0 to Dundee United. Brittain dedicated the win against Celtic to his late friend Graham Heggie. During the 2009–10 season, Brittain signed a new contract with the club. In the 2010–11 season, Brittain would be involved in leading Ross County to a 2–0 win against Queen of the South in the final of the Scottish Challenge Cup.

In the 2011–12 season, and into the first six games of 2012–13, Brittain captained Ross County through a post war Scottish record of 40 league games undefeated, over a full calendar year. This run helped Ross County win the 2011–12 Scottish First Division by a record margin of 24 points and promotion to the Scottish Premier League for the first time in the club's history. Brittain would describe as his "greatest day of my career". Brittain would sign a one-year contract with the club.

In the 2012–13 season, Brittain was involved in the club's first league match in the top-flight, where Ross County drew 0–0 with Motherwell. Brittain would score the club's first goal in the top-flight, as Ross County drew 1–1 with Celtic. and scored another in the next match, giving Ross County their first win in the SPL, against Dundee.

For the start of the 2013–14, Brittain agreed to join St Johnstone on a two-year deal after signing a pre-contract with the club on 9 January 2013. Brittain was previously criticised by St Johnstone Manager Steve Lomas earlier in the 2012–13 season, calling him a "cheat". He then changed his mind and said he wanted to stay at Ross County, who then registered him as their player preventing St Johnstone from doing so. When Ross County and St Johnstone played on 21 April 2013, Brittain received jeers from St Johnstone fans, though he received praise from Ross County fans. During the match, Brittain scored two penalties in a 2–2 draw. After the match, Manager Adams praised Brittain's performance in the match.

On 27 June 2013 St Johnstone announced they had reached agreement with Ross County to transfer Brittain back to them for a fee of £40,000. This remains the highest sum St.Johnstone have received for a player that did not actually play for them. Ross County though, have denied any transfer fee was paid, they say a donation was made to St Johnstone's community programme.

At the start of the 2013–14 season, Brittain missed two games at the start of the season after being suspended over an incident in a pre-season friendly match. After serving his two match suspension, Brittain scored a brace in a 3–0 win over St Mirren on 24 August 2013. Four weeks later on 21 September 2013 against Hearts, Brittain provided an assist for Melvin de Leeuw to equalised and in return, de Leeuw then provided assist for Brittain to score the winning goal, in a 2–1 win. In the return game against Hearts on 23 November 2013, Brittain was then sent-off for second bookable offense, which the game ended a 2–2 draw. On 11 January 2014, Brittain provided a hat-trick assist, in a 3–3 draw against Partick Thistle. Brittain scored his fourth goal of the season, in a 2–1 loss against Hibernian on 15 February 2014. In a return game against Partick Thistle on 1 March 2014, Brittain scored his fifth goal of the season, which they drew 1–1. Brittain scored his sixth goal of the season, in a 2–1 win over Kilmarnock on 26 April 2014. On 6 May 2014, Brittain scored the winning goal, from the penalty spot, as Ross County beat Hibernian 1–0, a result that confirmed the club's place in the Scottish Premiership for another season.

In the 2014–15 season, Brittain continued as club captain, however his season was overshadowed by injury, which resulted him making twenty-four appearances in all competitions. At the end of the 2014–15 season, Brittain was released by the "Staggies".

Brora Rangers
Brittain signed for Highland League club Brora Rangers during the 2015 close season, while at the same time, starting a new career in the construction industry.

Coaching career

Brora Rangers
On 16 July 2015, Brittain was appointed player-manager of Highland Football League side Brora Rangers, succeeding Davie Kirkwood as manager. Brittain resigned as manager in April 2016 due to "occupational activities and family commitments," but said he hoped to continue as a player at the club.

Ross County
Britain was appointed assistant manager of Ross County on 10 June 2020 were he would work under his former teammate Stuart Kettlewell. After Kettlewell was sacked by Ross County Brittain continued in his role under John Hughes. He left this role in June 2021 after the appointment of Malky Mackay as Ross County manager.

Personal life
In 2012, Brittain became a father after his wife give birth to a baby daughter. Starting a family "made him prioritise his family over his career".

Brittain's rejection of a move to St Johnstone in 2013 caused him to receive hate messages on Twitter. His wife, Diane, had condemned the abuse the family was receiving. Brittain stated he stayed at Ross County for family reasons.

Career statistics

Honours

Player

Ross County
Scottish Challenge Cup: 2010–11

Individual
Scottish Football League Player of the Month: March 2012

Manager
Brora Rangers
Highland League Cup: 2015–16

References

External links

1983 births
Living people
Scottish footballers
Scottish Premier League players
Livingston F.C. players
Raith Rovers F.C. players
St Mirren F.C. players
Ross County F.C. players
Scottish Football League players
Association football midfielders
People from Bathgate
Footballers from West Lothian
Scottish Professional Football League players
Lothian Thistle Hutchison Vale F.C. players
Brora Rangers F.C. players
Scottish football managers
Brora Rangers F.C. managers
Highland Football League players
Ross County F.C. non-playing staff
Highland Football League managers